The World Heritage Earthen Architecture Programme (WHEAP) is a UNESCO initiative promoting earthen architecture founded in 2007 and running till 2017.

Sites 
At the programme's conclusion in 2017, the 150 World Heritage Sites in its ambit were the following:

 Alhambra, Generalife and Albayzín, Granada
 Ancient Ksour of Ouadane, Chinguetti, Tichitt and Oualata
 Ancient City of Damascus
 Ancient City of Ping Yao
 Ancient Thebes with its Necropolis
 Angkor
 Antigua Guatemala
 Archaeological Ruins at Moenjodaro
 Archaeological Site of Carthage
 Archaeological Site of Volubilis
 Archaeological Zone of Paquimé, Casas Grandes
 Asante Traditional Buildings
 Ashur (Qal'at Sherqat)
 At-Turaif District in ad-Dir'iyah
 Bahla Fort
 Bam and its Cultural Landscape
 Biblical Tels - Megiddo, Hazor, Beer Sheba
 Buddhist Monuments in the Horyu-ji Area
 Cahokia Mounds State Historic Site
 Canal du Midi
 Capital Cities and Tombs of the Ancient Koguryo Kingdom
 Cathedral, Alcázar and Archivo de Indias in Seville
 Chaco Culture
 Chan Chan Archaeological Zone
 Changdeokgung Palace Complex
 Churches and Convents of Goa
 City of Cuzco
 City of Potosí
 City of Quito
 City of Safranbolu
 Classical Gardens of Suzhou
 Cliff of Bandiagara (Land of the Dogons)
 Coffee Cultural Landscape of Colombia
 Complex of Koguryo Tombs
 Coro and its Port
 Cultural Landscape and Archaeological Remains of the Bamiyan Valley
 Cultural Sites of Al Ain (Hafit, Hili, Bidaa Bint Saud and Oases Areas)
 Fortifications of Vauban
 Frontiers of the Roman Empire
 Fujian 
 Gyeongju Historic Areas
 Haeinsa Temple Janggyeong Panjeon, the Depositories for the Tripitaka Koreana Woodblocks
 Harar Jugol, the Fortified Historic Town
 Hatra
 Himeji-jo
 Historic Centre of Bukhara
 Historic Centre of Camagüey
 Historic Centre of Cordoba
 Historic Centre of Évora
 Historic Centre of Guimarães
 Historic Centre of Lima
 Historic Centre of Morelia
 Historic Centre of Oaxaca and Archaeological Site of Monte Albán
 Historic Centre of Oporto, Luiz I Bridge and Monastery of Serra do Pilar
 Historic Centre of Puebla
 Historic Centre of Salvador de Bahia
 Historic Centre of Santa Ana de los Ríos de Cuenca
 Historic Centre of Santa Cruz de Mompox
 Historic Centre of São Luís
 Historic Centre of Shakhrisyabz
 Historic Centre of the Town of Diamantina
 Historic Centre of the Town of Goiás
 Historic Centre of the Town of Olinda
 Historic Centre of Zacatecas
 Historic City of Meknes
 Historic City of Sucre
 Historic Ensemble of the Potala Palace, Lhasa
 Historic Monuments of Ancient Kyoto (Kyoto, Uji and Otsu Cities)
 Historic Monuments of Ancient Nara
 Historic Monuments Zone of Querétaro
 Historic Quarter of the City of Colonia del Sacramento
 Historic Quarter of the Seaport City of Valparaíso
 Historic Site of Lyon
 Historic Town of Guanajuato and Adjacent Mines
 Historic Town of Ouro Preto
 Historic Town of Sukhothai and Associated Historic Towns
 Historic Town of Zabid
 Historic Villages of Korea: Hahoe and Yangdong
 Historic Villages of Shirakawa-go and Gokayama
 Island of Mozambique
 Itchan Kala
 Itsukushima Shinto Shrine
 Jongmyo (Seoul)
 Joya de Cerén Archaeological Site
 Kasbah of Algiers
 Kathmandu Valley
 Koutammakou, the Land of the Batammariba
 Ksar of Ait-Ben-Haddou
 Kunya-Urgench
 León Cathedral
 M'Zab Valley
 Mausoleum of the First Qin Emperor
 Medina of Fez
 Medina of Marrakesh
 Medina of Sousse
 Medina of Tunis
 Meidan Emam, Esfahan
 Memphis and its Necropolis – the Pyramid Fields from Giza to Dahshur
 Mesa Verde National Park
 Minaret and Archaeological Remains of Jam
 Mogao Caves
 Mount Wutai
 National Archeological Park of Tierradentro
 Old City of Sana'a
 Old Havana and its Fortification System
 Old Town of Cáceres
 Old Town of Galle and its Fortifications
 Old Town of Ghadamès
 Old Town of Lijiang
 Old Towns of Djenné
 Old Walled City of Shibam
 Osun-Osogbo Sacred Grove
 Parthian Fortresses of Nisa
 Persepolis
 Port, Fortresses and Group of Monuments, Cartagena
 Pre-Hispanic City of Teotihuacan
 Protective town of San Miguel and the Sanctuary of Jesús Nazareno de Atotonilco
 Proto-urban Site of Sarazm
 Provins, Town of Medieval Fairs
 Punic Town of Kerkuane and its Necropolis
 Qal’at al-Bahrain – Ancient Harbour and Capital of Dilmun
 Rock-Hewn Churches, Lalibela
 Royal Hill of Ambohimanga
 Royal Palaces of Abomey
 Royal Tombs of the Joseon Dynasty
 Ruins of León Viejo
 Ruins of Loropéni
 Sacred City of Caral-Supe
 Samarkand – Crossroad of Cultures
 Samarra Archaeological City
 Sanctuary of Bom Jesus do Congonhas
 Seokguram Grotto and Bulguksa Temple
 Shrines and Temples of Nikko
 Shushtar Historical Hydraulic System
 Soltaniyeh
 State Historical and Cultural Park "Ancient Merv"
 Sukur Cultural Landscape
 Tabriz Historic Bazaar Complex
 Takht-e Soleyman
 Taos Pueblo
 Tchogha Zanbil
 The Great Wall
 The Persian Garden
 Timbuktu
 Tomb of Askia
 Tombs of Buganda Kings at Kasubi
 Trinidad and the Valley de los Ingenios
 Viñales Valley
 Walled City of Baku with the Shirvanshah's Palace and Maiden Tower
 Yin Xu

References

UNESCO